General elections were held in the Netherlands on 30 November and 4 December 1848. Held immediately after the Constitutional Reform of 1848, they were the first direct elections to the House of Representatives, and were the first to elect a States General to which government ministers would be responsible. Voting was restricted to men over the age of 23, and who paid a certain level of taxation. This limited the franchise to 55,728 people, roughly 11% of the male population over 23, or 2.5% of the total population of the country. Candidates were elected in districts in a two-round system; if no candidate received over 50% of the vote in the first round, the top two candidates would face a run-off. The districts had one MP for every 45,000 inhabitants.

As there were no official political parties until 1879, all candidates were nominally independents.

Results

By district

References

General elections in the Netherlands
Netherlands
1848 in the Netherlands
Non-partisan elections
November 1848 events
Election and referendum articles with incomplete results